Demos is the seventeenth album by Crosby, Stills & Nash, released in 2009 on Rhino Records. It peaked at #104 on the Billboard 200.

Content
A compilation album, it consists of demo versions of solo and group songs recorded between 1968 and 1971. One recording, "Music Is Love," includes their some-time partner Neil Young. Most of the tracks feature solo vocals rather than the group's standard three-part harmony. Recordings took place at The Record Plant in New York City, and Wally Heider Studios in San Francisco and Los Angeles.

Track listing

Personnel
 David Crosby – vocals, acoustic guitar
 Stephen Stills – vocals, acoustic guitar
 Graham Nash – vocals, piano, acoustic guitar
 Neil Young – vocal on "Music Is Love"
 Paul Rothchild – engineer
 Bill Halverson – engineer

References

External links
 CSN website

Crosby, Stills, Nash & Young compilation albums
Demo albums
2009 compilation albums
Atlantic Records compilation albums
Albums produced by Neil Young
Albums produced by Stephen Stills
Albums produced by Graham Nash
Rhino Records compilation albums